Ramona Christine Jennex (born June 4, 1955) is a former Canadian educator and politician from the province of Nova Scotia.

Early life and education
Jennex was born in Halifax, Nova Scotia, raised in Chester and Dartmouth, among other places.

Jennex attended the Baptist Leadership Training School in Calgary, Alberta from 1975–76, followed by her enrollment at Acadia University in Wolfville in fall 1973. Jennex graduated from Acadia with a B.Mus, B.A. and a B.Ed. (Special Education). Jennex was employed as a teacher in the Annapolis Valley and later completed a M.Ed. at Acadia, followed by another M.Ed. at Mount Saint Vincent University.

Jennex volunteered with numerous community organizations as well as with the Nova Scotia Teachers Union.

Political career
Jennex ran for the Nova Scotia New Democratic Party nomination in the riding of Kings South in 2009.  She was elected in the 2009 provincial election and represented that riding in the legislature until her defeat in the 2013 provincial election.

On June 19, 2009, Jennex was appointed to the Executive Council of Nova Scotia as Minister of Service Nova Scotia and Municipal Relations, Minister of Emergency Management, Minister of Immigration, and Minister of Youth. On January 11, 2011, Jennex was appointed Minister of Education and Early Childhood Development, and the Minister responsible for Youth.

Personal life
She has four children and four grandchildren.

Position history 
 Minister of Education and Early Childhood Development (April 4, 2013 – October 22, 2013)
 Minister responsible for Youth (June 19, 2009 – October 22, 2013)
 Minister of Education (January 11, 2011 – April 4, 2013)
 Minister of Service Nova Scotia and Municipal Relations (June 19, 2009 – January 11, 2011)
 Minister of Emergency Management (June 19, 2009 – January 11, 2011)
 Minister of Immigration (June 19, 2009 – January 11, 2011)
 Minister responsible for the Residential Tenancies Act (June 19, 2009 – January 11, 2011)

References

Living people
Nova Scotia New Democratic Party MLAs
Women MLAs in Nova Scotia
Members of the Executive Council of Nova Scotia
People from Halifax, Nova Scotia
21st-century Canadian politicians
21st-century Canadian women politicians
Women government ministers of Canada
Canadian schoolteachers
1955 births